Pumamarka (Aymara and Quechua puma cougar, puma, marka village, "puma village", Hispanicized spelling Pumamarca) is an archaeological site in Peru. It is located in the Cusco Region, Urubamba Province, Ollantaytambo District, at the confluence of the rivers Patakancha and its affluent Yuraqmayu (Quechua for "white river", Hispanicized Yuracmayo).

See also 
 Kusichaka River
 Ullantaytampu
 Pinkuylluna
 Willka Wiqi
 Willkaraqay

References

Archaeological sites in Cusco Region
Archaeological sites in Peru
Inca